Gannys (gr. Γάννυς or Γαίννυς) was a Roman general who commanded the troops of Elagabalus (officially named Antoninus) against Emperor Macrinus in the Battle of Antioch.

According to Edward Gibbon in his Decline and Fall of the Roman Empire:

The contemporary historian Cassius Dio writes:

On the way to Rome, Elagabalus and his entourage spent the winter of 218 in Bithynia at Nicomedia, where Gannys was put to death. Cassius Dio suggests that Gannys, a virtual "foster-father and guardian" to the new emperor, was killed because he pressured Elagabalus to live "temperately and prudently":

Notes

218 deaths
Elagabalus
Year of birth unknown
3rd-century Romans
Ancient Roman generals